Francisc Nemeș (17 January 1907 – 7 November 1991) was a Romanian sprinter. He competed in the men's 400 metres at the 1936 Summer Olympics.

References

1907 births
1991 deaths
Athletes (track and field) at the 1936 Summer Olympics
Romanian male sprinters
Olympic athletes of Romania
Place of birth missing